The San Blas Range is a mountain range north of Lake Bayano and runs adjacent the San Blas Islands in Panama.

Mountain ranges of Panama